110th Street station may refer to:
 110th Street station (IRT Ninth Avenue Line), a station on the demolished IRT Ninth Avenue Line
 110th Street station (IRT Lexington Avenue Line), a local station in East Harlem

See also
 Cathedral Parkway–110th Street station (disambiguation)
 Central Park North–110th Street station, a station in Harlem